Student Assembly Against Racism is the student wing of the United Kingdom National Assembly Against Racism.

References

External links 
 Student Assembly Against Racism - latest news from 2007

Anti-racist organisations in the United Kingdom
Student organisations in the United Kingdom